Alexander Baryatinsky may refer to:

Aleksandr Baryatinsky (1815–1879), Russian field marshal 
Alexander Vladimirovich Baryatinsky (1870–1910), Russian soldier and bon vivant